The Women's College World Series (WCWS) is the final portion of the NCAA Division I softball tournament for college softball in the United States. Eight teams participate in the WCWS, which begins with a double-elimination tournament. In other words, a team is eliminated when it has lost two games. After six teams have been eliminated, the remaining two teams compete in a best-of-three series to determine the Division I WCWS National Champion.

Opponents are chosen in such a way that it is possible for any two of the eight teams to meet in the championship series. In this respect the WCWS differs from the Men's College World Series in baseball, in which the eight teams are divided into two brackets of four teams each, and the winner of one bracket meets the winner of the other bracket in the best-of-three championship series.

The WCWS takes place at USA Softball Hall of Fame Stadium in Oklahoma City.  From 1969 to 1981, the women's collegiate softball championship was also known as the Women's College World Series and was promoted as such. During 1969–1979, the series was played in Omaha, after which the Association for Intercollegiate Athletics for Women (AIAW) held the series in 1980–1982 in Norman, Oklahoma. There were two competing World Series tournaments in 1982. The NCAA held its first six Division I tournaments in Omaha in 1982–1987, followed by Sunnyvale, California in 1988–1989. The event has been held in Oklahoma City every year since then, except for 1996, when it was held at the softball venue for the upcoming Olympic Games in Columbus, Georgia.

Softball was one of twelve women's sports added to the NCAA championship program for the 1981–82 school year, as the NCAA engaged in battle with the AIAW for sole governance of women's collegiate sports. The AIAW continued to conduct its established championship program in the same twelve (and other) sports. The 1982 softball championship tournaments of both the AIAW and the NCAA were called "Women's College World Series". However, after a year of dual women's championships, the NCAA won out over the AIAW. Pac-12 schools have won 65% of the Championships since 1982, followed by the Big 12 with 10%, and the SEC, with 7.8% (Texas A&M played in the Southwest when it won its 2 championships).

The 2020 Women's College World Series was canceled due to the COVID-19 pandemic.

Division I

NCAA

* Nebraska's runner-up finish in 1985 was vacated by the NCAA.

** The 1995 title by UCLA and any related records have been vacated by the NCAA due to scholarship violations.  Criticism also centered on UCLA player Tanya Harding who was recruited from Queensland, Australia midway through the 1995 season. After UCLA captured the NCAA National Championship, Harding, the MVP of the tournament, returned to her homeland without taking final exams or earning a single college credit. Despite not violating any formal rules in recruiting Harding, the incident generated heated criticism that some foreign athletes were little more than hired guns.

*** Beginning in 2005, a best-of-three series determines the national championship.

AIAW
From 1969 to 1972, the DGWS (forerunner organization of the AIAW) recognized the WCWS, organized by the Amateur Softball Association, as the collegiate championship tournament. The AIAW assumed responsibilities from DGWS in 1973.

NCAA team titles by school

*UCLA also won the 1995 title, but it has since been vacated by the NCAA; see above.

AIAW team titles by school
From 1969 to 1972, the DGWS (forerunner organization of the AIAW) recognized the WCWS, organized by the Amateur Softball Association, as the collegiate championship tournament. The AIAW assumed responsibilities from DGWS in 1973.

Championships & appearances by school
 Color coded by current conference.
 Bold indicates team championship.
 Teams are listed under their current athletic brand names.

‡ UCLA's 1995 NCAA championship and Nebraska's 1985 runner-up finish were vacated by the NCAA and are not counted

Championships & appearances by conference

This listing excludes results of the pre-NCAA Women's College World Series of 1969 through 1982 (both Division I tournaments in 1982—AIAW and NCAA—were called "Women's College World Series").

Notes

See also 
 List of NCAA Division I softball programs
 Women's College World Series Most Outstanding Player
 College softball
 NCAA Division I softball tournament
 NCAA Division II Softball Championship
 NCAA Division III Softball Championship
 AIAW Intercollegiate Women's Softball Champions

References

 
Recurring sporting events established in 1982